The following is a list of teams and cyclists that took part in the 2022 Giro d'Italia Donne.

Teams

UCI Women's WorldTeams

 
 
 
 
 
 
 
 
 
 
 
 
 

UCI Women's Continental Teams

 
 
 
 
 
 Colombia Tierra de Atletas–GW–Shimano
 
 
 Team Mendelspeck

Cyclists

By starting number

By team

By nationality

Notes

References

Giro d'Italia Femminile
Grand Tour (cycling) squads